First Presbyterian Church is a historic Presbyterian church building at 26 W. Babcock in Bozeman, Montana.

The Late Gothic Revival building was constructed during 1908-1910 and added to the National Register of Historic Places in 1989.

It was designed by architects Turnbull & Jones of Elgin, Illinois; its construction was supervised by local contractor Frank Vreeland.  Foundation stone was hauled by volunteers from a quarry in Bridger Canyon.  After completion, it was dedicated on February 20, 1910.

References

Presbyterian churches in Montana
Churches on the National Register of Historic Places in Montana
Gothic Revival church buildings in Montana
Churches completed in 1908
Buildings and structures in Bozeman, Montana
1908 establishments in Montana
National Register of Historic Places in Gallatin County, Montana